Valur Orri Valsson (born 15 June 1994) is an Icelandic basketball player for the Keflavík of the Icelandic Úrvalsdeild karla.

Playing career
Playing the point guard position, Valur started is senior team career in 2009 at the age of 14 with Njarðvík before moving to FSu and later Keflavík.
During the 2015–16 regular season, he posted career highs of 12.9 points and 5.5 assists per game, good for fourth best in the league.

He played college basketball for Florida Tech from 2016 to 2020. Despite having to sit out his first season with the team due to his age, he became the schools all-time leader in assists in 2020. After his college career ended, he announced he would return to Iceland to finish the 2019–20 season with Keflavík.

Personal life
Valur Orri is the son of Valur Ingimundarson, the Úrvalsdeild karla all-time leading scorer.

References

External links
Icelandic statistics
Florida Tech bio

1994 births
Living people
Florida Tech Panthers men's basketball players
Valur Orri Valsson
Valur Orri Valsson
Valur Orri Valsson
Point guards
Valur Orri Valsson
Valur Orri Valsson